David Milne is an Australian former professional rugby league footballer who played in the 2000s and 2010s.  Milne last played for the Mackay Cutters which is a feeder team for the North Queensland Cowboys. His usual position was as a Fullback.

Playing career
Milne debuted for the Canberra Raiders in 2005, winning the club's rookie of the year award.  After a period moving between the NRL and Premier League Milne returned to the Raiders side in round 9 of 2007, securing a regular first grade position at wing. Early 2008 a season-ending injury to William Zillman gave Milne the opportunity to start at fullback after Bronx Goodwin failed to hold his position as the fill in Fullback for Zillman.

After limited opportunities in Canberra and being the 3rd choice fullback behind Josh Dugan and Nathan Massey, Milne signed with the North Queensland Cowboys in October 2011 and played for their feeder team the Mackay Cutters in 2012.

References 

1986 births
Living people
Australian rugby league players
Canberra Raiders players
Mackay Cutters players
Rugby league wingers
Rugby league fullbacks
Rugby league players from Griffith, New South Wales